Kavireh Guyez (also Romanized as Kavīreh Gūyez; also known as Kavereh Gowz; original Kurdish spelling: Kwêre Gwêz) is a village in Tamugheh Rural District, in the Central District of Saqqez County, Kurdistan Province, Iran. At the 2006 census, its population was 202, in 33 families. The village is populated by Kurds.

References 

Towns and villages in Saqqez County
Kurdish settlements in Kurdistan Province